The Canal de la Marne au Rhin (Marne–Rhine Canal) is a canal in north-eastern France. It connects the river Marne and the Canal entre Champagne et Bourgogne in Vitry-le-François with the port of Strasbourg on the Rhine. The original objective of the canal was to connect Paris and the north of France with Alsace and Lorraine, the Rhine, and Germany.

Description
It has 154 locks, including two in the Moselle. There are four tunnels. The Saint-Louis-Arzviller inclined plane is located between Arzviller and Saint-Louis and its construction replaced 17 locks.

In 1979, a  section along the Moselle valley was closed following the completion of the Moselle canalisation works between Frouard and Neuves-Maisons. The route is now made up as follows:
 Canal de la Marne au Rhin, western section (PK 0-131), connecting with the Canal de la Meuse at Troussey (PK 111), and with a branch to Houdelaincourt (PK 85),
 the navigable river Moselle from Toul to Pompey and the Frouard branch from Pompey to Frouard (a distance of 25 km, slightly longer than by the original canal),
 the eastern section, from Frouard to Strasbourg (PK 154-313); this section connects with the Nancy branch at Laneuveville-devant-Nancy (PK 169),  the Canal de la Sarre at Gondrexange (PK 228), and the river Ill in Strasbourg (PK 311). 
The western section,  has 97 locks, 70 rising to the summit level and 27 down to the Moselle at Toul. The Moselle section has three locks of high-capacity Rhine dimensions on the river and one on the Frouard branch, and an additional Freycinet size lock connecting to the original canal in Frouard. The eastern section, has 56 locks, 21 rising to the summit level crossing the Vosges watershed and 35 down to Strasbourg.

Its course crosses the following départements and towns:
Marne: Vitry-le-François
Meuse: Bar-le-Duc, Ligny-en-Barrois, Void-Vacon
Meurthe-et-Moselle: Toul, Nancy
Moselle: Gondrexange, Sarrebourg
Bas-Rhin: Saverne, Strasbourg

En Route

See also
 List of canals in France

References

External links
 Canal de la Marne au Rhin with maps and detailed information on places, ports and moorings on the canal, by the author of Inland Waterways of France, Imray
 Navigation details for 80 French rivers and canals (French waterways website section)

Canals in France
Canals opened in 1853
CMarne-RhineCanal